Sova may refer to:

 2647 Sova, a main-belt asteroid
 Slovenian Intelligence and Security Agency, the main civilian intelligence service in Slovenia
 Sova, Iran, a village in Mazandaran Province, Iran
 Sova (river), a river in Perm Krai, Russia
 Sova (surname), a list of people with the surname

See also
 
 SOVA (disambiguation)